Alec Newman (born 27 November 1974) is a Scottish actor best known for portraying Paul Atreides in the Sci Fi Channel's 2000 miniseries adaptation of Frank Herbert's Dune.

Early life
Newman was born in Glasgow, Scotland. His father is Sandy Newman, a member of Scottish band Marmalade. He has a brother, John James Newman, who appeared on The Voice UK in 2012. Prior to joining the National Youth Theatre in London at age 17, Newman considered becoming a professional footballer. He trained at the London Academy of Music and Dramatic Art.

Career

After graduating from LAMDA Newman built up a steady list of television and film credits before landing the lead role in the Sci Fi channel's Emmy award winning miniseries Frank Herbert's Dune. This led to a string of appearances in US TV and film, which culminated in winning the coveted role of Barnabas Collins in a WB reboot of Dark Shadows. The show was not picked up for series despite promising performances.

The 2004 Hallmark Channel version of Frankenstein with Newman leading an all star cast including William Hurt and Donald Sutherland, met with favourable reviews and won an Emmy. This period also found Newman consistently working on film - in Penny Woolcock's The Principles of Lust and in the Stephen Fry directed Bright Young Things. Both played at festivals around the world including Cannes Film Festival, Sundance Film Festival and the BFI London Film Festival.

Series regular roles in Kurt Sutter's The Bastard Executioner, Amazon's Rogue, and HBO's Strike Back saw him in edgier and often action oriented territory, yet in Guy Pitt's 2014 film Greyhawk Newman's more intimate and emotional performance contributed to a nomination for the Michael Powell award at the Edinburgh International Film Festival. He has since worked with directors Tomas Alfredson, Amma Asante and George Clooney.

Newman has often played edgy and complex characters. Performances in the BBC's Showtrial and World Production's Karen Pirie are recent examples of roles with a moral conflict at their core.

He regularly returns to work in the theatre. The Donmar Warehouse production of King Lear in which he played Edmund, transferred to the Brooklyn Academy of Music, New York. The National Theatre's 2015 production of The Motherfucker with the Hat featured Newman in the title role and was nominated at the Evening Standard Theatre Awards for Best Play. More recently, he played Bruno Bischofberger in the Young Vic production of Anthony McCarten's new play The Collaboration opposite Paul Bettany, Jeremy Pope and Sofia Barclay. 

He is also a prolific voice artist appearing in numerous video games including Cyberpunk 2077, Assassin's Creed Valhalla, and Lego Star Wars: The Skywalker Saga.

Personal life
In February 2013, Newman became engaged to Heather Stewart. They married in Ayrshire in June 2014.

Newman is a huge football fan and has indulged a love for the outdoors, twice trekking in the Everest region of Nepal.

He lives with his family in Surrey, England.

Filmography

Film

Television

Video games

References

External links
 
 

Male actors from Glasgow
Scottish male film actors
Scottish male stage actors
Scottish male television actors
Scottish male video game actors
Scottish male voice actors
National Youth Theatre members
Living people
1974 births
20th-century Scottish male actors
21st-century Scottish male actors